Léon Pottier was a Belgian athlete. He competed in the men's shot put at the 1920 Summer Olympics.

References

Year of death missing
Year of birth missing
Athletes (track and field) at the 1920 Summer Olympics
Belgian male shot putters
Olympic athletes of Belgium
Place of birth missing